"You Almost Slipped My Mind" is a single by American country music artist Kenny Price. It was released in March 1972 as the only single from his album of the same name. The song peaked at number 44 on the Billboard Hot Country Singles chart.

The song was also recorded by American country music artist Charley Pride. Pride's version released in September 1980 as the first single from his album Roll On Mississippi. It peaked at number 4 on the Billboard Hot Country Singles chart.

Chart performance

Charley Pride

References

1972 singles
1980 singles
Kenny Price songs
Charley Pride songs
RCA Records singles
Songs written by Troy Seals
Songs written by Don Goodman (songwriter)
1972 songs